Greeta Marie Fahey (born 1930) is a former international lawn bowls competitor for Australia.

Bowls career
She won the triples and fours gold medal at the 1988 World Outdoor Bowls Championship in Auckland.

She won two medals at the 1989 Asia Pacific Bowls Championships in Suva, Fiji.

References

Australian female bowls players
Bowls World Champions
Living people
1930 births
20th-century Australian women